Alexander Kwangwari (born 28 December 1968) is a Zimbabwean boxer. He competed in the men's light middleweight event at the 1996 Summer Olympics, and later became a boxing coach.

References

External links
 

1968 births
Living people
Zimbabwean male boxers
Olympic boxers of Zimbabwe
Boxers at the 1996 Summer Olympics
Place of birth missing (living people)
Light-middleweight boxers